Crispim do Amaral (1858 - December 17, 1911) was an actor, decorator, journalist, painter, draftsman, illustrator, and  caricaturist in Brazil.

He edited The Courier in 1879 in Para, Brazil and was its illustrator. He traveled to Paris in 1888. Back in Brazil he moved to Rio de Janeiro where he founded the magazines O Malho, A Avenida, O Pau, and O Século.

He was born in Olinda.

Amaral painted the curtain of the Amazon Theatre (debuted 1897) in Manaus titled "Meeting of the Waters".

At the Brazilian National Exposition of 1908 he painted the interior murals of the Minas Geraes state pavilion including a series of images personifying agriculture, mineralogy, manufactures and the liberal arts. The building was designed by Rafael Rebecchi. Exhibits at the pavilion included aspects of gold and diamond mining. 

He died in Rio de Janeiro.

References

1858 births
1911 deaths
Brazilian male stage actors
Brazilian magazine founders
People from Olinda
19th-century Brazilian male actors
Brazilian cartoonists
British male painters
19th-century Brazilian painters
19th-century Brazilian male artists
British newspaper editors